Apiosporina is a genus of fungi in the family Venturiaceae. Seeds of the Chinese elm, Trident maple and Japanese black pine can be infected with Apiosporina collinsii to produce dwarf forms used to make bonsai trees.

References

External links
Apiosporina at Index Fungorum

Venturiaceae